Oleksandr Vasylyovych Horvat (born 17 June 1995) is a Ukrainian professional footballer who plays as a left back.

References

External links
 Profile on Kryvbas Kryvyi Rih official website
 

1995 births
Living people
Sportspeople from Kryvyi Rih
Ukrainian footballers
Association football defenders
FC Hirnyk Kryvyi Rih players
FC Inhulets Petrove players
FC Barsa Sumy players
FC Kremin Kremenchuk players
MFC Mykolaiv players
MFC Mykolaiv-2 players
FC Kryvbas Kryvyi Rih players
Ukrainian First League players
Ukrainian Second League players
IV liga players
Ukrainian expatriate footballers
Expatriate footballers in Poland
Ukrainian expatriate sportspeople in Poland